The 1956 Bulgarian Cup Final was the 16th final of the Bulgarian Cup (in this period the tournament was named Cup of the Soviet Army), and was contested between Levski Sofia and Botev Plovdiv on 18 November 1956 at Vasil Levski National Stadium in Sofia. Levski won the final 5–2.

Match

Details

See also
1956 A Group

References

Bulgarian Cup finals
Botev Plovdiv matches
PFC Levski Sofia matches
Cup Final